A special election was held on September 10, 2019 to fill the vacancy in  in the United States House of Representatives for the remainder of the 116th United States Congress. Walter B. Jones Jr., the incumbent representative, died on February 10, 2019.

Parties held primaries to decide their nominees. In order to win a party nomination outright, under current state law, a candidate must exceed 30% of the vote to avoid a runoff (presuming that the second-place finisher calls for that runoff). There must be 30 days of absentee voting prior to each election, according to state law. Filing began on March 4 and ended March 8, as set by Governor Roy Cooper. Twenty-six candidates filed with the State Board of Elections by the filing deadline: 17 Republicans, 6 Democrats, 2 Libertarians, and 1 Constitution Party candidate. All candidates filed are affiliated with a political party. Five candidates advanced after the first primary elections: two Republicans, one Democrat, one Libertarian, and one Constitution Party candidate.

Cooper set the primary date of April 30, in which the Democrats selected Allen M. Thomas, Libertarians selected Tim Harris, and in the Constitution Party primary businessman Greg Holt won by default, but no Republican achieved 30% of the vote. Voting for the Republican primary runoff occurred on Tuesday, July 9, between two candidates that are both physicians, Greg Murphy and Joan Perry. Approximately 70 minutes after polls closed, Murphy was declared the winner by the Associated Press.

The general election was held on September 10, 2019. Murphy won the seat.

With the decision by the State Board of Elections to hold a new election to redo the 2018 U.S. House election in North Carolina's 9th district, this became one of two congressional district special elections in North Carolina in 2019, the other being the 9th district's special election held on the same day. This was the first time two U.S. House special elections were held in the same state on the same day (not on Election Day) since the May 3, 2008, elections in Louisiana's 1st district and 6th district.

Republican primary

Candidates

Nominee
Greg Murphy, member of the North Carolina House of Representatives from the 9th District

Eliminated in runoff
Joan Perry, pediatrician

Eliminated in primary
Kevin Baiko, doctor
Paul Beaumont, Currituck County Commissioner
Graham Boyd, farmer
Celeste Cairns, accountant
Gary Ceres, library technician
Chimer Davis Clark Jr., small businessman 
Don Cox, singer
Francis De Luca, former president of Civitas Institute
Phil Law, Marine Corps veteran and candidate for U.S. Representative in 2016 and 2018
Jeff Moore, small businessman
Michele Nix, Vice Chair of the North Carolina Republican Party
Mike Payment, Currituck County Commissioner
Eric Rouse, Lenoir County Commissioner
Phil Shepard, member of the North Carolina House of Representatives from the 15th district
Michael Speciale, member of the North Carolina House of Representatives from the 3rd district

Declined
Harry Brown, member of the North Carolina Senate from the 6th District and incumbent North Carolina Senate Majority Leader
George G. Cleveland, member of the North Carolina House of Representatives from the 14th District
Scott Dacey, former Vice-Chairman of the Craven County Board of Commissioners and candidate for U.S. Representative in 2018
Pete Gilbert, Pasquotank County Republican Party Chairman
Ed Goodwin, member of the North Carolina House of Representatives from the 1st District
Taylor Griffin, former aide to Jesse Helms and candidate for U.S. Representative in 2014 and 2016
Bobby Hanig, member of the North Carolina House of Representatives from the 6th District
Chris Humphrey, member of the North Carolina House of Representatives from the 12th District
Keith Kidwell, member of the North Carolina House of Representatives from the 79th District
Pat McElraft, member of the North Carolina House of Representatives from the 13th District
Joe McLaughlin, former Onslow County Commissioner, candidate for U.S. Representative in 2008, candidate for North Carolina Commissioner of Insurance in 2016, and candidate for State Representative in 2018
Carl Mischka, chairman of the 3rd Congressional District Republican Party Executive Committee
Frank Palombo, candidate for U.S. Representative in 2012
Norman W. Sanderson, member of the North Carolina Senate from the 2nd district
Sandy Smith, small businesswoman
Bob Steinburg, member of the North Carolina Senate from the 1st District
Paul Wright, Soil and Water Conservation District Supervisor Area 5 Dare County

Endorsements

First round

Polling

Results

Runoff

Results

Democratic primary

Candidates

Nominee
Allen Thomas, former mayor of Greenville and executive director of Global TransPark

Eliminated
Richard Bew, former U.S. Marine Corps colonel
Gregory Humphrey, former journalist
Ike Johnson, Democratic nominee for State House district 14 in 2018
Dana Outlaw, mayor of New Bern
Ernest T. Reeves, Democratic nominee for North Carolina's 3rd congressional district in 2016

Declined
Ollie Nelson, retired U.S. Marine, educator, and pastor
George Parrott, businessman
Scott Thomas, District Attorney for North Carolina's 4th prosecutorial district

Endorsements

Results

Libertarian primary

Candidates

Declared
Shannon Bray, U.S. Navy veteran, author, cybersecurity expert
Tim Harris, U.S. Marine Corps veteran, IT engineer, candidate for North Carolina Senate for the 2nd district in 2018

Results

Constitution primary

Candidates

Nominee (by default)
Greg Holt, businessman

General election 
During the early voting period for this election, Hurricane Dorian battered the eastern coast of the United States, necessitating early voting to be halted in several counties on the Outer Banks until the storm had passed. This also happened in the election for North Carolina's 9th congressional district.

Predictions

Endorsements

Polling

with generic Republican and generic Democrat

Fundraising

Results

Despite the clear victory, 61.7% is the lowest Republican vote share in this district since 2012.

See also
List of special elections to the United States House of Representatives

Notes
Partisan clients

Additional candidates

References

External links
Official campaign websites
 Greg Holt (C) for Congress 
 Greg Murphy (R) for Congress
 Allen Thomas (D) for Congress

North Carolina 03
2019 03
North Carolina 03
United States House of Representatives 03
United States House of Representatives 2019 03
North Carolina 2019 03
September 2019 events in the United States